Stephen Wood (born August 18, 1981) is an American ice hockey coach and former defenseman who was an All-American for Providence.

Career
Wood joined the ice hockey team at Providence in 2000, playing as a depth defenseman for a team that reached the Hockey East finals and earned a bid to the NCAA Tournament. He took a more prominent role as a sophomore, leading the Friars' defense in scoring for three consecutive seasons. Unfortunately, the team was only marginally successful during this period. After finishing with a sub-.500 record in 2002, Wood helped Providence keep their heads above water as an upperclassmen but only just. In his final three years, the Friars went 1–6 in playoff games, losing the conference quarterfinals each season. Despite the middling results, Wood was well-regarded and named an All-American as a senior.

After graduating with a degree in business management, he signed a professional contract with the Philadelphia Flyers and began in their minor league system. He split his first full season between the AHL and ECHL, finishing the year with the Trenton Titans and helping the club win the Kelly Cup. After a second divided season, Wood began to move around and played for four different teams over a two year period. In 2008 he travelled to Europe and played two more years before retiring.

Wood's second career began shortly thereafter when he started working as an account executive for Hitachi Data Systems. After five years he joined Dell Technologies as a global account manager. In 2017, Wood left the accounting world and founded his own company, Beyond the Ice. The business provides a 7-week virtual hockey school for youth players, focusing on character building and mental aspects of the game.

Career statistics

Regular season and playoffs

Awards and honors

References

External links

Beyond the Ice home page

1981 births
Living people
AHCA Division I men's ice hockey All-Americans
American men's ice hockey defensemen
Ice hockey people from Massachusetts
People from Cambridge, Massachusetts
Providence Friars men's ice hockey players
Philadelphia Phantoms players
Trenton Titans players
Peoria Rivermen (AHL) players
Alaska Aces (ECHL) players
Bridgeport Sound Tigers players
Trenton Devils players
Herning Blue Fox players
Esbjerg Energy players
Sheffield Steelers players